Oshtut may refer to:
 Oshtut-e Bala
 Oshtut-e Pain